Bernabé de Chávarri (born 1 February 1904, date of death unknown) was a Spanish field hockey player. He competed in the men's tournament at the 1928 Summer Olympics.

References

External links
 

1904 births
Year of death missing
Spanish male field hockey players
Olympic field hockey players of Spain
Field hockey players at the 1928 Summer Olympics
Field hockey players from Madrid